The Lo Nuestro Award for Pop Album of the Year was an honor presented annually by American television network Univision at the Lo Nuestro Awards. The accolade was established to recognize the most talented performers of Latin music. The nominees and winners were originally selected by a voting poll conducted among program directors of Spanish-language radio stations in the United States and also based on chart performance on Billboard Latin music charts, with the results being tabulated and certified by the accounting firm Deloitte. However, since 2004, the winners are selected through an online survey. The trophy awarded is shaped in the form of a treble clef.

The award was first presented to Desde Andalucía by Spanish singer Isabel Pantoja in 1989. Spanish performer Enrique Iglesias holds the record for the most wins with four. Mexican singer Luis Miguel won consecutively in 1994 for Aries and in 1995 for Segundo Romance;  both albums also earned the Grammy Award for Best Latin Pop Performance. In 1999, the Pop Album of the Year accolade was shared by Mexican band Maná and Shakira with Sueños Líquidos and Dónde Están los Ladrones?, respectively. Both albums were nominated at the 41st Grammy Awards for Best Latin Rock/Alternative Performance, with Maná receiving the award. Spanish band La 5ª Estación, and Mexican groups Camila, Maná, Pandora, RBD, Sin Bandera, and Santana are the only musical ensembles to receive the accolade, the latter group also won the Grammy Award for Album of the Year. In 2017, Primera Cita by American band CNCO became the last recipient of the award. Mexican singer Cristian Castro was the most nominated artist without a win, with six unsuccessful nominations.

Winners and nominees
Listed below are the winners of the award for each year, as well as the other nominees.

Multiple wins and nominations

See also

 Grammy Award for Best Latin Pop Album
 Latin Grammy Award for Best Female Pop Vocal Album
 Latin Grammy Award for Best Contemporary Pop Vocal Album
 Latin Grammy Award for Best Male Pop Vocal Album
 Latin Grammy Award for Best Pop Album by a Duo or Group with Vocals
 Latin Grammy Award for Best Traditional Pop Vocal Album

References

Pop Album
Latin pop albums
Pop music awards
Awards established in 1989
Awards disestablished in 2017
Album awards